The 15463/64 Balurghat – Siliguri Junction Intercity Express is an Express train belonging to Indian Railways Northeast Frontier Railway zone that runs between  and  in India.

It operates as train number 15463 from Balurghat to Siliguri Junction and as train number 15464 in the reverse direction serving the states of  Bihar & West Bengal.

Coaches
The 15463 / 64 Balurghat – Siliguri Junction Intercity Express has nine general unreserved & two SLR (seating with luggage rake) coaches . It does not carry a pantry car coach.

As is customary with most train services in India, coach composition may be amended at the discretion of Indian Railways depending on demand.

Service

Route

The train has following halts
 
 
 
 
 
 
 
 Harishchandrapur

Traction

As the route is going to electrification, a  based WDP-4D or Malda Town based ALCO WDM 3A locomotive pulls the train to its destination.

References

External links
15463 Intercity Express at India Rail Info
15464 Intercity Express at India Rail Info

Intercity Express (Indian Railways) trains
Rail transport in Bihar
Rail transport in West Bengal
Transport in Siliguri
Railway lines opened in 2010
2010 establishments in India